Robert Richard "Robin" Davies (16 January 1954 – 22 February 2010) was a Welsh television and film actor.

Early life
Robert Richard Davies was born in Tywyn, Wales and spent part of his childhood living in Willesden where he attended Gladstone Park School Primary School. He trained to be an actor at the Aida Foster Theatre School.

Career
He was a child actor and made his television debut in the BBC soap opera The Newcomers. He was also in The Magnificent Six and a Half, which went on to become the children's show Here Come the Double Deckers. He is perhaps best known for two of his earliest TV roles. In 1970 he played the role of Carrot in Richard Carpenter's children's fantasy Catweazle, for which he had to dye his hair red.

The following year, Davies appeared as Simon Harrison in the ITV sitcom ...And Mother Makes Three. The series starred Wendy Craig as a recently widowed mother and Davies played one of her two teenage sons, a role he reprised in the sequel ...And Mother Makes Five. His film credits included the Lindsay Anderson films If.... (1968), The Blood on Satan's Claw (1971) and Britannia Hospital (1982), and a cameo in Shakespeare in Love (1998). He also had roles in Doomwatch, Warship, The Saturday Party, Forget Me Not Lane, The Country Party, A Moment in Time and Spearhead.

Personal life
He married Venetia Vivian in 1982 and they had three children: India, Alice and Will.

He died in Norwich, Norfolk on 22 February 2010 of lung cancer, and was interred at St Peter's Church, Walsingham, Norfolk, on 1 March 2010.

Filmography

References

External links
 The original Catweazle Website, launched in 1997

1954 births
2010 deaths
Welsh male child actors
Welsh male film actors
People from Merionethshire
Welsh male television actors
Deaths from lung cancer in England
People from Tywyn
Alumni of the Aida Foster Theatre School